Saint Frances Cabrini High School is a Catholic coeducational high school located in Allen Park, Michigan.  Located in the Roman Catholic Archdiocese of Detroit, it has been in operation since 1960.  The school colors are navy blue and gold, and they are known as the Monarchs.

Notable graduates of Cabrini High School include design award-winning, custom jeweler, Amber Ann Hall (Gustafson) (1979), a member of the prestigious American Gem Society, residing in Texas. In 2009–2010, the Michigan Association of Secondary School Principals assistant principal of the year recipient was Sinder Gundick, a 1983 graduate of Cabrini High School.

Athletics
The Cabrini women's softball team from 2007 holds the national record for allowing the fewest runs in a season (1).  The team also made headlines for a 35–0 season to follow up their 2006 season, where the team went 39–0, taking home back-to-back State titles during those two seasons.

Notable graduates in terms of athletics include Amanda Chidester, University of Michigan softball, and Alana Maffesoli, University of Michigan Rowing.

References

Roman Catholic Archdiocese of Detroit
Catholic secondary schools in Michigan
Educational institutions established in 1960
Schools in Wayne County, Michigan
1960 establishments in Michigan